Helastia alba is a moth of the family Geometridae. This species is endemic to New Zealand and is found only in the South Island. This species inhabits native forest or scrubland and can be observed in montane to subalpine Nothofagus dominant forests. It has also been observed at lower altitudes in native podocarp forests. Larvae of this species have been raised on mosses. This species is very similar in appearance to other species in the genus Helastia but specimens can be distinguished by the dissection of their genitalia.

Taxonomy 
This species was first described by Robin C. Craw in 1987. The male holotype, collected by Merlin Owen Pascoe in Queenstown, is held in the New Zealand Arthropod Collection.

Description

Craw described this species as follows:

Distribution
This species is endemic to New Zealand. This species is found only in the South Island and has been observed in the in following regions: Nelson, Buller, North Canterbury, Mid Canterbury, Mackenzie, Otago Lakes, Fiordland and Southland. In the Otago Lakes region it is regarded as being widespread but local in occurrence.

Species within the genus Helastia are very similar in appearance and as such can be difficult to identify. H. alba has frequently been confused with H. cinerearia or with H. mutabilis. However all these species can be distinguished from one another by the dissection of the genitalia of the specimen.

Habitat 
This species inhabits the edge of native forest or shrubland. It lives in Nothofagus forests at altitudes ranging from montane to sub-alpine. It has also been observed in native podocarp forests at lower altitudes.

Host species
Larvae have been raised on mosses.

References

Moths of New Zealand
Endemic fauna of New Zealand
Moths described in 1987
Cidariini
Taxa named by Robin Craw
Endemic moths of New Zealand